Marvin Earl "Monty" Roberts MVO (born May 14, 1935) is an American horse trainer who promotes his techniques of natural horsemanship through his Join-Up International organization, named after the core concept of his training method. Roberts believes that horses use a non-verbal language, which he terms "Equus," and that humans can use this language to communicate with horses.  In order to promulgate his methods, Roberts has authored a number of books including his original best-seller, The Man Who Listens to Horses, and regularly tours with a live demonstration.  He runs an Equestrian Academy in Solvang, California and an "online university" to promote his ideas.

Early life
Monty Roberts was born in Salinas, California and is the son of horse trainer Marvin E Roberts, who authored his own self-published book, Horse and Horseman Training, in 1957.  Roberts claims that his father also beat him as a child, although other family members, including his younger brother Larry, dispute this version of events, with his aunt and cousin, Joyce Renebome and Debra Ristau, specifically refuting the allegation in the book Horse Whispers & Lies.

Roberts competed in rodeo and won his first trophy at the age of four.  He attended California Polytechnic State University, San Luis Obispo ("Cal Poly") and riding for their rodeo team, he won two National Intercollegiate Rodeo Association (NIRA) National Championships, including National NIRA Champion Bulldogger in 1957, the NIRA Champion Team Roping in 1956.  He graduated from Cal Poly in 1959 with a degree in animal science.

In 1966, Roberts assisted in the founding of Flag Is Up Farms, of which he is now the full owner. From 1973 to 1986, he was a leading consignor to the Hollywood Park Two-Year-Old Thoroughbreds in Training Sale. In 2004, Roberts’ German-bred horse Sabiango won major races throughout the US.

Career
Roberts describes in his books and web site how he was sent to Nevada at the age of 13 in order to round up horses for the Salinas Rodeo Association's Wild Horse Race, and there began observing mustangs interact with each other. It was there he realized that horses use a discernible, effective and predictable body language to communicate, set boundaries, show fear and express annoyance, relaxation or affection. Roberts states he came to understand that utilizing this silent language would allow training to commence in a much more effective and humane manner, encouraging true partnership between horses and humans.  Roberts describes this language as Equus and he refers to it frequently in his books, tours and demonstrations.

In his books, he has written about how he strongly disagreed with his father's equine training methods, which he described as "almost torturing the animals into submission". Morever, Marvin Roberts' own book has described training methods similar to the "Join-up" technique developed by son. However, critics have also noted parallels between the training methods of both father and son. In 2000 critics of Roberts registered a website using his name: www.montyroberts.org. After litigation, WIPO ruled against these parties stating they had "engaged in abusive registration" and transferred ownership to Roberts. Roberts says the website owners tried to blackmail him for US$90,000 to transfer the domain name.

Three documentaries on Roberts have been released. The first was the 1997 documentary BBC/PBS Monty Roberts: The Real Horse Whisperer. It showed Roberts as he set out to tame a wild mustang without enclosures, and his developing relationship with the horse later known as Shy Boy. Other documentaries include the 1999 film Shy Boy: The Horse That Came in from the Wild and a 2005 documentary on Roberts' work with wild horses and another about his work with aboriginal youth on Palm Island, Australia. In 2006, a DVD series with 17 episodes, named A Backstage Pass! was completed and broadcast in the UK. The series has also been broadcast in the US on the HRTV cable channel.
He has his own show on Horse & Country TV, Backstage Pass with Monty Roberts.

Horse training

Live demonstrations

Roberts travels around the world, demonstrating his method of horse training to paying audiences, as well as volunteering time for audiences such as incarcerated youth in juvenile detention facilities. Roberts also teaches his techniques to students at his Equestrian Academy in Solvang, California, acts as a consultant at schools with disciplinary issues in the UK and the US, and advises executives at Fortune 500 companies.  He also runs the "Equus Online University" to promote his ideas.

Royal connections

An event which would change the direction of his life was an invitation in 1989 from the offices of Queen Elizabeth II, who was an avid horsewoman. After hearing about Roberts' training techniques, she invited him to come to the United Kingdom to demonstrate his "Join Up" method to her stable staff. After watching his demonstration, Roberts said the Queen urged him to write a book about his nonviolent methods, which became The Man Who Listens to Horses. During his book tour of the UK in 1996, Roberts presented a copy of his book to the Queen.

In 2002 Roberts returned to Windsor Castle as part of the Queen's Golden Jubilee. In the 2011 Birthday Honours, Roberts was appointed an Honorary Member of the Royal Victorian Order (MVO) "for services to Her Majesty's racing establishment". In June 2012, the Queen, as Patron of Join–Up International, attended the Guards Polo Club, and along with Roberts presented awards to international polo trainers from South and Central America in recognition of their work in promoting the non–violent training of horses.

After the death of the Queen on 8 September 2022, Roberts was invited to her funeral on 19 September.

Writing
Roberts has published several books. His first was the autobiographical The Man Who Listens to Horses which was published in 1996, which was on the New York Times Bestsellers list for 58 weeks, and translated into more than 15 languages, selling more than five million copies worldwide.  Roberts has written other books, including best-selling Shy Boy: The Horse That Came in from the Wild (1999), Horse Sense for People (2001), From My Hands to Yours (2002), The Horses in My Life (2005) and Ask Monty (2007).

Awards

In 2002, Roberts received an honorary doctorate in animal psychology from the University of Zurich, Switzerland and in 2005 he gained an honorary doctorate in animal psychology from the University of Parma, Italy. In 2004, the Girl Scouts of the USA commissioned a special Join-Up badge and training program in honor of Roberts' work, and in 2005 he became the first foreign-born recipient of the German Silbernes Pferd (Silver Horse) Award for outstanding contributions to promoting the love of horses. In December 2008, readers of the British equestrian magazine Your Horse named Monty Roberts Personality of the Year 2008.

See also
 Horse Whispers and Lies (1999 biography)
 'People who Train People: An interview with Monty Roberts.' (1997) The Teacher Trainer. Vol. 11 No. 3 pp 14–15 Pilgrims: Canterbury.

References

External links
 
 
Monty Roberts on Horse & Country TV

1935 births
Living people
Western horse trainers
American racehorse trainers
Natural horsemanship
American biographers
Honorary Members of the Royal Victorian Order